is the 10th studio album by Japanese singer/songwriter Chisato Moritaka, released on July 15, 1996 by One Up Music. The album features the hit singles "Yasumi no Gogo", "So Blue", and "La La Sunshine", as well as two commercial jingles for Suntory liquor products. "Gin Gin Gin" served as the basis for Moritaka's 1995 Christmas single "Jin Jin Jingle Bell". Taiyo is also the second album in Moritaka's catalog to include a cover version of a Beatles song. A limited edition release included a lenticular cover featuring Moritaka changing her facial expressions and a 10-page photo book.

The album reached No. 3 on Oricon's albums chart and sold over 386,000 copies. It was also Moritaka's last album to be certified Platinum by the RIAJ.

Track listing 
All lyrics are written by Chisato Moritaka, except where indicated; all music is arranged by Yuichi Takahashi, except where indicated.

Personnel 
 Chisato Moritaka – vocals, drums (all tracks), rhythm guitar (2), recorder (13, 15)
 Yuichi Takahashi – guitar, keyboards, backing vocals (1–7, 9–10, 12–15)
 Hideo Saitō – guitar, bass, horns, tambourine, backing vocals (8)
 Yasuaki Maejima – Fender Rhodes (1–3, 11, 12), piano (4, 6, 8, 12), keyboards (7), percussion (7), organ (8)
 Shin Hashimoto – piano (1, 4–5, 9-10, 13–14), taishōgoto (10, 14), keyboards (13–15), guitar (13–14)
 Yukio Seto – bass (1–2, 4–6, 10, 13–15), guitar (2–4, 7, 11–12, 14), wind chime (11)
 Masafumi Yokoyama – bass (3, 12)
 Teruo Moritaka – bass (11)
 Henderson – backing vocals (5)
 Takahisa Yuzawa – backing vocals (10)

Charts

Certification

References

External links 
 
 
 

1996 albums
Chisato Moritaka albums
Japanese-language albums